Humphrey's Restaurant & Tavern (also referred to as Humphrey's or Hump's) is a college bar near Saint Louis University. For almost four decades, the restaurant and tavern at the corner of Spring and Laclede was the close-to-campus destination for many students. That was the basis for the 2001 film, One Night at McCool's, written by Stan Seidel, and yet the movie was not shot here, as it was considered "not appropriate for filming." Seidel, who died just prior to the film's debut, was a frequent customer at Humphrey's before writing the film.

The tavern opened on June 18, 1976, and is named after its owner, Robert "Humphrey" Mangelsdorf.

Mr. Mangelsdorf was born in St. Louis. In 1968, he earned a bachelor's degree in business administration from St. Louis University, where he was a member of Phi Kappa Theta fraternity.

Humphrey's is known by SLU students for its Wednesday night "Penny Pitchers," complimentary birthday "plunger shots," and Tuesday night trivia contest. The restaurant offers American style bar foods.

The tavern closed on January 1, 2017. Originally the structure was going to be demolished and rebuilt, but it instead was heavily renovated. Humphrey's reopened in November 2022.

References

External links
Humphrey's Official Website

Drinking establishments in Missouri
Buildings and structures in St. Louis
1976 establishments in Missouri